Strephonota is a Neotropical genus of butterflies in the family Lycaenidae. The genus was erected by Kurt Johnson, George T. Austin, Jean Francois Le Crome and Julián A. Salazar E. in 1997.

Species
Strephonota acameda (Hewitson, 1867)
Strephonota adela (Staudinger, 1888)
Strephonota agrippa (Fabricius, 1793)
Strephonota ambrax (Westwood, 1852)
Strephonota azurinus (Butler & H. Druce, 1872)
Strephonota berardi Faynel & A. Moser, 2011
Strephonota bicolorata Faynel, 2003
Strephonota buechei Faynel & A. Moser, 2011
Strephonota caeruleus Faynel & A. Moser, 2011
Strephonota carteia (Hewitson, 1870)
Strephonota cyllarissus (Herbst, 1800)
Strephonota elika (Hewitson, 1867)
Strephonota ericeta (Hewitson, 1867)
Strephonota falsistrephon Faynel & Brévignon, 2003
Strephonota foyi (Schaus, 1902)
Strephonota jactator (H. H. Druce, 1907)
Strephonota malvania (Hewitson, 1867)
Strephonota parvipuncta (Lathy, 1926)
Strephonota perola (Hewitson, 1867)
Strephonota porphyritis (H. H. Druce, 1907)
Strephonota pulchritudo (H. H. Druce, 1907)
Strephonota purpurantes (H. H. Druce, 1907)
Strephonota sphinx (Fabricius, 1775)
Strephonota strephon (Fabricius, 1775)
Strephonota syedra (Hewitson, 1867)
Strephonota tephraeus (Geyer, 1837)
Strephonota trebonia (Hewitson, 1870)
Strephonota tyriam (H. H. Druce, 1907)

References

Eumaeini
Lycaenidae of South America
Lycaenidae genera